SM UC-61 was a German Type UC II minelaying submarine or U-boat in the German Imperial Navy during World War I. The U-boat was ordered on 12 January 1916, laid down on 3 April 1916, and was launched on 11 November 1916. She was commissioned into the German Imperial Navy on 13 December 1916 as SM UC-61. In five patrols UC-61 was credited with sinking 12 ships, either by torpedo or by mines laid. UC-61 was stranded north of Boulogne on 26 July 1917. The U-boat's crew flooded and scuttled their ship before surrendering to French authorities. The wreckage silted up but in some years becomes visible at low tide offshore in Wissant. As of 24 January 2019, the submarine had been partially visible since December 2018, and some locals were hopeful that due to shifting winds and tides, the submarine would be visible more often.

Design
A German Type UC II submarine, UC-61 had a displacement of  when at the surface and  while submerged. The submarine was powered by two six-cylinder four-stroke diesel engines each producing  (a total of ), two electric motors producing , and two propeller shafts.

UC-61 was fitted with six  mine tubes, eighteen UC 200 mines, three  torpedo tubes (one on the stern and two on the bow), seven torpedoes, and one  Uk L/30 deck gun. Her complement was twenty-six crew members.

Summary of raiding history

References

Notes

Citations

Bibliography

 
 

Ships built in Bremen (state)
German Type UC II submarines
U-boats commissioned in 1916
Maritime incidents in 1917
U-boats scuttled in 1917
World War I minelayers of Germany
World War I shipwrecks in the English Channel
World War I submarines of Germany
1916 ships